Anvah-ye Kalan was a village in Bamyan Province in northern-central Afghanistan, it was destroyed by fighting between the Taliban and NATO troops and is now uninhabited.

See also
Bamyan Province

References

External links
Satellite map at Maplandia.com

Populated places in Bamyan Province